is a Japanese actress and voice actress. She was born in Kawaguchi, Saitama, and made her professional singing debut on April 7, 1993, as a member of the J-Pop group Aurora Gonin Musume. She is best known for her roles from the anime series as Yuzuriha Nekoi in Tsubasa Chronicle, Hinako in Sister Princess, Doremi Harukaze in Ojamajo Doremi, Nanaka Kirisato in Nanaka 6/17, Wanya in UFO Baby and Kyoko Kirisaki in Black Cat. She announced on February 25, 2013, that she had gotten married.

Filmography

Television animation
1998
Verda Tanko He Mo-su – Micah
Chosoku Spinner – Rian Yumemiya

1999
Space Pirate Mito – Konabi
Hoshin Engi – Kibi
Aoi & Mutsuki: A Pair of Queens – Konabi
Ojamajo Doremi – Doremi Harukaze
Zoids – Merrian

2000
Mon Colle Knights – Adventurers Pocket
Pilot Candidate – Saki Mimori
Daa! Daa! Daa! – Wannya
Ojamajo Doremi Sharp – Doremi Harukaze
Gate Keepers – Saemi Ukiya
Tottoko Hamtarō Dechu – Ponytail-chan

2001
Mo~tto! Ojamajo Doremi – Doremi Harukaze
Mobile Angel: Angelic Layer – Arisu Fujisaki
Sister Princess – Hinako

2002
Ojamajo Doremi Dokka~n! – Doremi Harukaze
Mirmo de Pon! – Akumi
The Twelve Kingdoms – Kei-Kei
Asobotto Senki Goku – Marie
Sister Princess: Re Pure – Hinako
Galaxy Angel A – Hariu Framboise

2003
Nanaka 6/17 – Nanaka Kirisato
Kaleido Star – Lucy
Zatch Bell – Natsuko
Di Gi Charat Nyo – Housekeeper
Dokkoida?! – Hinako
Requiem from the Darkness – Orikudon
Rockman EXE Axess – AquaMan

2004
Legendz: Yomigaeru Ryuuou Densetsu – Anna
Duel Masters Charge – Imelda
Sweet Valerian – Lycorine
Pocket Monsters – Erica
Rockman EXE Stream – AquaMan

2005
Ah! My Goddess (Ex)
Black Cat – Kyoko Kirisaki
MÄR – Emokis
Odenkun – Tamago-chan
Tsubasa Chronicle – Yuzuriha Nekoi
Rockman EXE Beast – AquaMan
Mushi-Shi – Akoya

2006
Hime-sama Goyojin – Karen
Rockman EXE Beast+ – AquaMan

2007
Hatarakids My Ham Gumi – Sylvie

2008
Noramimi – Mai
Duel Masters Cross – Imelda
Monochrome Factor – Sarasa Nishikiori
Kyōran Kazoku Nikki – DojiDevil
Hakushaku to Yōsei – Merrow Girl
To Love-Ru – Magical Kyoko (ep. 10,20), Mio Sawada

2009
Marie & Gali – Marika
Gokujō!! Mecha Mote Iinchō – Temo Temo

2010
Marie & Gali ver. 2.0 – Marika
Motto To Love-Ru – Mio Sawada, Magical Kyoko
Star Driver – Benio Shinada / Scarlet Kiss

2012
To Love-Ru Darkness – Mio Sawada, Magical Kyoko

2013
Rozen Maiden – Zurückspulen (Kirakishou/Schnee Kristall)
Walkure Romanze – Fiona Beckford

2015
 To Love-Ru Darkness 2nd – Mio Sawada

2016
Tiger Mask W – Ruriko Yamashina

2017
 Kirakira PreCure a la Mode – Bibury

OVA
1998
Getter Robo: Armageddon – Operator

2004
Ojamajo Doremi Naisho – Doremi Harukaze

2005
Majokko Tsukune-chan – Kokoro

Theatrical animation
2000
Ojamajo Doremi Sharp the Movie – Doremi Harukaze
2001
Motto! Ojamajo Doremi the Movie – Doremi Harukaze
2013
Star Driver the Movie – Benio Shinada
2020
Looking for Ojamajo Doremi – Doremi Harukaze

Video games
1994
Sotsugyō Shashin/Biki – Ayumi Tachibana

2001
True Love Story 3 – Madoka Onodera
Kaenseibo – Kyoko Kiyono
Doki Pretty League Lovely Star – Aika Takagamine

2006
Black Cat ~Angel Clockwork~ – Kyoko Kirisaki

2008
To LoveRu: Waku Waku! Rinkangakkou-Hen – Mio Sawada, Magical Kyoko

2011
Star Driver: Kagayaki no Takuto - Ginga Bishounen Densetsu – Benio Shinada

 Yuki Aoyagi in Cosplay Senshi Cutie Knight
Kenka Gurentai
Marusō Kaizō Jidōsha Kyōshūjo 1 & 2

Photobooks
"Mizen" (1994, Bunkasha)

Dubbing
Barney & Friends - Baby Bop
Sofia the First - Princess Vivian

References

External links
Official agency profile 
Chiemi Chiba at Ryu's Seiyuu Info

1975 births
Living people
Japanese stage actresses
Japanese video game actresses
Japanese voice actresses
Voice actresses from Saitama Prefecture
People from Kawaguchi, Saitama